The High Falls Film Festival, founded in 2001, is a film festival that focuses on celebrating women in film. The festival is inspired by Rochester, New York's legacy in nitrate film and the women’s rights movement.

High Falls Film Festival presents multiple features, documentaries, and shorts, including a children's program and student-filmmaker program. The festival includes emerging and established female talent, with past guests including actresses Kerry Washington, Christine Lahti, Angela Bassett, Jane Alexander, Candice Bergen, Joan Allen, Famke Janssen, and CCH Pounder, and voice-over actress Nancy Cartwright. The festival is held in Rochester's East End entertainment district.

The festival aligned with the Rochester International Film Festival in 2007 and with George Eastman House in 2009 under the name George Eastman House 360 | 365 Film Festival. The festival took a hiatus in 2012 and returned in 2013.

Awards

The Susan B. Anthony "Failure is Impossible" Award Honors a woman in the film industry who has persevered in her career and triumphed over difficulties. 
 2001: Pam Grier, actress
 2002: Lainie Kazan, actress
 2003: Candice Bergen, actress
 2004: Sally Kellerman, actress
 2005: Angela Bassett, actress
 2006: Agnieszka Holland, director
 2008: Rita Moreno, actress
 2009: Lynn Redgrave and C.C.H. Pounder, actresses
 2010: Thelma Schoonmaker, editor
 2011: Julie Taymor, filmmaker

The Golden Lens Award for CinematographyHonors a person who has made creative contributions of outstanding artistic significance to the field of cinematography. 
 2011: Buddy Squires

The Rochester Film Legacy AwardHonors a filmmaker or film supporter based in the Rochester area whose passion and dedication embodies Rochester’s proud film legacy.
 2011: Brock Yates
 2015: Marilyn O'Connor
 2016: June Foster

The Faith Hubley "Web of Life" AwardNamed after its first recipient, honors a woman who understands the power of art in connecting with an audience and in making the world a better place. 
 2001: Faith Hubley, animator
 2002: Nancy Cartwright, voice actor
 2003: Jeannie Epper, stuntwoman
 2004: Mira Nair, filmmaker
 2005: Jane Alexander, actor

The Elizabeth Cady Stanton "Thorn in the Side" AwardHonors women who exemplify the collaborative nature of film and video. The award is named in honor of Stanton, who said: "If there is one part of my life which gives me more intense satisfaction than another, it is my friendship with Susan B. Anthony... we have indeed been thorns in the side of each other..."
 2006: Stella Pence, (retired) Co-Director, Telluride Film Festival
 2008: Estela Bravo, director
 2009: Debra Zimmerman

Audience Choice AwardeesFestival audiences chose Best Feature, Best Documentary and Best Short. Past Audience Award winners include:
2001
 Best Feature: No Man's Land
 Runner-Up: Fast Runner
 Best Documentary: Southern Comfort
 Runner-Up: Endurance

2002
 Best Feature: Nowhere In Africa
 Runner-Up: Frida
 Best Documentary: Blue Vinyl
 Runner-Up: Sister Helen

2003
 Best Feature: In America
 Best Documentary: My Architect

2004
 Best Feature: Dear Frankie
 Best Documentary: Born Into Brothels

2005
 Best Feature: The World's Fastest Indian
 Best Documentary: Christa Mcauliffe: Reach For The Stars
 Best Short: A Life To Live

2006
 Best Feature: The Lives Of Others
 Best Documentary: American Blackout
 Best Short: Sintonia

2008
 Best Feature: Phoebe in Wonderland
 Best Documentary: Autism: The Musical

2009
 Best Feature: Skin
 Best Documentary: Signs Of The Time
 Best Short: Julie, Julie

2010
 Best Feature: Welcome
 Best Documentary: Waiting For "Superman"

2011
 Best Feature: The First Grader

2016
 Best Feature: Sugar!
 Best Documentary: My Love Affair With The Brain: The Life and Science of Dr. Marian Diamond 2015
 Best Feature: The Lennon Report
 Best Documentary: Yemeniettes 2011
 Best Documentary: Bill Cunningham New York
 Best Short: Shoegazer

See also 
 List of women's film festivals

References

External links
highfallsfilmfestival.com Official site

Film festivals in New York (state)
Festivals in Rochester, New York
Women's film festivals in the United States
Women in New York (state)